The 2000–01 season was the 104th season of competitive football by Heart of Midlothian, and their 18th consecutive season in the top level of Scottish football, competing in the Scottish Premier League. Hearts also competed in the UEFA Cup, Scottish Cup and League Cup.

Managers

Hearts started the season under the stewardship of Jim Jefferies. He moved on to Bradford during the season, Peter Houston became Caretaker manager for 4 games before Craig Levein became Hearts new permanent manager.

First team squad
Squad at end of season

Left club during season

Fixtures

Pre-Season Friendlies

Scottish Premier League

Uefa Cup

League Cup

Scottish Cup

League table

See also
List of Heart of Midlothian F.C. seasons

References

External links 
 Official Club website
 Complete Statistical Record

Heart of Midlothian F.C. seasons
Heart of Midlothian F.C.